Harahvaiti may be:
a reconstructed old name of the Iranian deity Anahita
the old names of the following:
Arachosia, an ancient region in south Afghanistan
the Arghandab River flowing through it
Alexandria Arachosia, the main city in the region, later known as Kandahar

See also 
 Sarasvati, a Hindu goddess